Albert Roy McDougall (2 July 1907 – 15 November 1993) was an  Australian rules footballer who played with Fitzroy in the Victorian Football League (VFL).

Notes

External links 

1907 births
1993 deaths
Australian rules footballers from Melbourne
Fitzroy Football Club players
People from Port Melbourne
Australian Army personnel of World War II
Military personnel from Melbourne